Golbui may refer to:
 Golbui-ye Bala
 Golbui-ye Pain